The 1910 West Wicklow by-election was held on 29 March 1910.  The by-election was held due to the death of the incumbent Irish Parliamentary MP, James O'Connor.  It was won by the Irish Parliamentary candidate Edward Peter O'Kelly, who was unopposed.

References

1910 elections in Ireland
1910 elections in the United Kingdom
By-elections to the Parliament of the United Kingdom in County Wicklow constituencies
Unopposed by-elections to the Parliament of the United Kingdom (need citation)